Basabi Nandi (5 December 1935 – 22 July 2018) was an Indian actress and singer active in the Bengali cinema. She received Best Supporting Actress Award by Bengal Film Journalists' Association for the movie Bon Palashir Padabali in 1974.

Career
Nandi was born in 1935 in British India. Her father B.L. Nandi was a reputed doctor in Dhaka. She completed her schooling from United Missionary Girls High School, Kolkata thereafter passed I.A. from Ashutosh College. Nandi was interested in songs and classical dances since childhood. She learned Bengali songs from Satinath Mukhopadhay and Utpala Sen, and took lessons from Gavindan Kutty. Ananta Singh picked Nandi for his movie Jamalaye Jibanta Manush in 1958 which was a breakthrough in her career. She also acted with Uttam Kumar in a few films. Nandi performed as playback singer and published her own records of music.

Filmography
 Jamalaye Jibanta Manush
 Mriter Martye Agaman
 Abhaya O Srikanta
 Sakher Chor
 Do Dilon Ki Dastaan (Hindi)
 Baghini
 Nabaraag
 Kaya Hiner Kahini
 Bon Palashir Padabali
 Aami Sirajer Begum
 Rodanbhara Basanta
 Sei Chokh
 Rater Kuheli
 Shatru Pakhha
 Gajamukta
 Aami Se O Sakha

References

External links

1935 births
2018 deaths
Indian film actresses
Actresses in Bengali cinema
20th-century Indian actresses
Bengali Hindus